Mandera Airport is an airport in Mandera, Kenya.

Location
Mandera Airport  is located in Mandera, Mandera County, Kenya, near the tripoint where the International borders of Kenya, Ethiopia and Somalia intersect.

The geographic coordinates of this airport are:3° 56' 15.00"N, 41° 50' 55.00"E (Latitude:3.937500; Longitude:41.848610).

Overview
Mandera Airport is a small civilian airport, serving Mandera and surrounding communities.

Airlines and destinations
Adesh fly operated by FLY 540 aviation services 
Freedom airlines 
I-Fly airlines

See also
 Kenya Airports Authority
 Kenya Civil Aviation Authority
 List of airports in Kenya

References

External links
   Location of Mandera Airport At Google Maps
   Website of Kenya Airports Authority
 

Airports in Kenya
Mandera County
North Eastern Province (Kenya)